The National Basketball League (NBL) is a men's professional basketball league in Australasia, currently composed of 10 teams: 9 in Australia and 1 in New Zealand. It is the premier professional men's basketball league in Australia and New Zealand.

History 

Before the establishment of the NBL, there were two national basketball competitions: the National Titles and the Australian Club Championships. 

In August 1979, the inaugural season of the NBL commenced, playing in the winter season (April–September) which it did so until the completion of the 1998 season, the league's twentieth season. The 1998–99 season, which began only months later, was the first to be played during the summer season (October–April). The shift, which is currently used by the league, was an attempt to avoid competing directly against Australia's various winter season football codes.  Officially the NBL is Australia's second oldest continuing national sporting competition after the domestic cricket competition as football competitions were predominantly state based until the 1980s.

The NBL experienced its "golden age" in the late 1980s and early 1990s, but its popularity, media attention, attendance and corporate support deteriorated and plateaued in the decade afterward with the growth of the country's four football codes.

A second Melbourne club, the South Dragons, entered the league in the 2006–07 season, but was short lived, soon folding 3 years later after the 2008–09 season in which they were premiers. In the 2006–07 season, the NBL became the first Australasian sporting league to field a team from Asia with the Singapore Slingers playing. The Gold Coast Blaze also joined the competition in the 2007–08 season. In 2007, Australian NBA player Andrew Bogut suggested the NBL try to adopt a model similar to the Australian Football League (AFL) whereby there are the same 10 or 15 teams over a 10-year period.
 
A turbulent period during 2008 and 2009 saw the league lose teams from Sydney, Melbourne, Brisbane and Singapore.

The 2009–10 season earmarked as the season in which the NBL would begin its revamping, much like the old National Soccer League which became the eight team A-League. The NBL returned to free-to-air television in Australia for the first time in three years with One broadcasting 2–3 games a week.

The 2010–11 season saw the return of the Sydney Kings after the club was purchased for 20,000 on 31 July 2008.

In 2013, the NBL had a de-merger from Basketball Australia.

Crowds improved for the 2013–14 NBL season, recording the highest cumulative crowd attendance figures for the past five years.

After numerous teams folding and a plummeting public profile property developer Larry Kestelman purchased a 51% portion of the league. Since then game attendance, TV viewership, website visitors and app downloads have been consistently on the increase.

In April 2016, the Townsville Crocodiles folded as they had become too financially unsustainable to continue.

Larry Kestelman has stated on the Aussie Hoopla podcast that no NBL club will ever fold again as long as he is in control of the league.

Allowing for clubs to recruit the best Australian players not in the NBA became easier with the marquee rule which saw the return from Europe and the US of players such as Brad Newley, David Andersen and Andrew Bogut. In addition the Special Restricted Player rule, introduced for the 2016–17 season, allows for clubs to recruit players born in countries such China, Philippines, Taiwan, India, South Korea, Singapore, and Japan who would not count as imports under NBL rules.

The growth of Basketball in Asia over recent years and the overall strength and standard of Australian Basketball should ensure the sustainability of the league for many years provided Asian players continue to strive to compete in the NBL and Asian basketball fans are able to follow the league.  Current trends should see the NBL as the third highest attended basketball league in the world, after the NBA and EuroLeague.

From 2016 to 2018, there was a renewed interest in the sport, with it being described as being the National Basketball League's greatest ever period. 2016–17 set a new attendance record for the league, with the figure being matched the following year, as well as the Grand Final series for the 2017–18 season.

In 2018, the South East Melbourne Phoenix were announced as the latest club to join the league, and started competing in the 2019–20 season; a season which was widely regarded as a major season for the league. After an active off-season, including the signings of LaMelo Ball and R. J. Hampton, two highly rated NBA 2020 draft picks, the league started by continuing to topple attendance records from the first round. The season's opening night had 10,300 fans in attendance to watch Melbourne United and the South East Melbourne Phoenix compete in the first "Throwdown", with a further 20,550 fans attending games across the first round. After signing a broadcasting deal with Facebook Watch, over one million American fans watched Ball's first game in the NBL against the Brisbane Bullets.

Following two condensed seasons due to the COVID-19 pandemic, the 2022–23 NBL season and the 2023 finals series saw a number of all-time attendance records being set for the league.

Competition format

Regular season 
Since the 2009–10 season, each team has played 28 games during the regular season, 14 home and 14 away. The regular season starts in early October and ends in mid February.

In the 2020–21 season, each team played an extra 8 games (36 games) due to the newly formatted NBL Cup tournament. The following season the NBL returned to their normal format of 28 games with no midseason tournament.

NBL Cup 

In the 2020–21 season, the NBL introduced the NBL Cup which is a 36-game mid-season competition. Each game would contribute to each team's regular season record.

Finals 

The top four teams at the end of the regular season advances to the Finals. The team finishing in the first and second position at the completion of the regular season receives home advantages in their best-of-three first round matchup against the team finishing in third and fourth position. The winner of each of the three matches advances to the Grand Final. The winner of Series 1 plays the winner of Series 2 in the best-of-five Grand Final series, with home advantage being awarded to the highest remaining seed. The winner of this series is crowned as NBL champion.

It has been announced that in the 2022–23 season, the NBL will introduce Play-In games. The top two seeds in the regular season will automatically qualify to the semi-finals. Teams ranked three to six will compete in the play-in tournament. The third seed will play the fourth seed for third spot and the loser will play the winner of fifth or sixth for the fourth seed.

Current clubs 

The NBL was founded in 1979 with nine teams. Due to club expansions, reductions and relocations, many of the teams either changed or ceased to exist. There are currently ten teams; nine teams in Australia and one team in New Zealand. The teams are located in Adelaide, Auckland, Brisbane, Cairns, Hobart, Melbourne, Perth, Sydney, and Wollongong. The Illawarra Hawks are the oldest club in the competition, having participated in every season since 1979.

The salary cap for each team is $AU1.1 million as a 'soft cap' with marquee players able to be paid amounts that will exceed that amount for the team.

Former clubs

Recent expansion 
After weeks of reports of a return of a Tasmanian team, in June 2019, Larry Kestelman flagged Tasmania as a potential 10th team. However he stressed that if a Tasmanian team did enter the NBL, they would be eased in, and that there was no timeline. On 28 February 2020, the NBL and the Tasmanian Government announced that they had reached an agreement for Tasmania to host the 10th team in the NBL, known as the Tasmania JackJumpers, which would join for the 2021–22 season.

In April 2022, Larry Kestelman flagged Canberra as a potential 11th team. Kestelman says “Canberra could be next in line for a league license, following the same model as the Tasmania JackJumpers.” The last Canberra team to play in the NBL was the Cannons from 1979–2003. They won three NBL championships and played their home games at the AIS Arena.

Rivalries 

Adelaide 36ers vs Brisbane Bullets

Arguably the NBL's oldest rivalry started in 1985 when the Brian Kerle coached Bullets defeated the Ken Cole coached 36ers 121–95 in the 1985 NBL Grand Final, the last single game Grand Final in NBL history. From 1985 to 1987, the Bullets and 36ers were the two dominant teams in the NBL and the two clubs met in the 1986 NBL Grand Final, the first NBL GF to be played over a 3-game series. An Australian indoor sports attendance record of around 11,000 saw the first game of the 1986 series played at the Brisbane Entertainment Centre with Adelaide, who had a 24–2 record for the season, winning 122–119 in overtime. Brisbane then handed Adelaide its only home loss of 1986 (the 36ers had gone 13–0 at the Apollo Stadium) when they won Game 2 104–83 before Adelaide won its first NBL title with a 113–91 win at Apollo in Game 3. The teams were evenly matched at the time with players such as Al Green, Mark Davis, Bill Jones, Peter Ali, Darryl Pearce, Mike McKay and Dwayne Nelson (Adelaide) against Brisbane's star import Leroy Loggins, captain Larry Sengstock, guard Ron Radliff, forwards Danny Morseu, Robert Sibley and Chris McGraw, centre John Dorge and (in 1985 and 1986) Cal Bruton. Loggins was the NBL MVP in 1986 and 1987 (and player of the match in the 1985 GF) while Mark Davis was the Grand Final MVP in 1986 and shared the NBL MVP award with Loggins in 1987.

The Rivalry between the two clubs again reached fever pitch in the mid-1990s when Bullets guard Shane Heal earned the ire of the Adelaide crowd during Game 3 of the 1994 Elimination final series when he gave the crowd at the Clipsal Powerhouse a 'double bird'. Heal, who had scored 61 points in the last regular season game before scoring 42 points in Game 1 to lead Brisbane to a 116–105 home win over the 36ers, had not actually managed to score a point before half time in Game 2 which the 36ers had won 99–91 before also winning Game 3 101–84. Heal, along with former 36er Mark Bradtke who had left under acrimonious circumstances at the end of 1992 to join the Melbourne Tigers, became public enemy #1 to the 36ers crowd following the incident.

With the Bullets returning to the NBL in 2016, the rivalry has continued with Adelaide defeating the Bullets in their first encounter at home, the Bullets returning the favour with an away win in Adelaide, while a week later Adelaide spoiled the Bullets regular season return to the Entertainment Centre for the first time since 1997 with a resounding 101–83 win.

Adelaide 36ers vs Melbourne United

Apart from the normal South Australian and Victorian rivalry, the 36ers vs United (formerly Tigers) rivalry started at the end of the 1992 season when 36ers centre Mark Bradtke joined Spanish club Juver Murcia following the 1992 Olympics in Barcelona, Spain for a short stint. Before he left he signed an agreement with the 36ers stating that he would finish his one-year contract with the club should he return within a certain time. Upon his return to Australia, Bradtke stated his intention not to return to the 36ers with the Tigers rumoured to be actively chasing him. After protracted negotiations with 36ers management that led to the club being prepared to buy out his remaining contract, the NBL stepped in and vetoed the buy out, effectively letting Bradtke leave for Melbourne without the 36ers receiving any compensation for the remainder of his contract with the club. When Bradtke returned to Adelaide with the Tigers on 4 July 1993 he was soundly booed whenever he touched the ball by the 8,000 strong crowd at the Clipsal Powerhouse. The booing of Bradtke and the Andrew Gaze led Tigers continued for a number of seasons.

A new rivalry has emerged with Julius Hodge, a former 36er, returning to the NBL in November 2009, signing with the Melbourne Tigers. Hodge was a star in Adelaide when he joined the 36ers mid-season the previous two years, however issues relating to alleged missed payments caused him to walk out on the club in early January 2009 on bad terms.

Hodge returned to his old home court for the first time on 5 December 2009 in a Tigers overtime victory. After being heckled and taunted all night in a quiet game by his standards, Hodge caused more controversy when he stamped and spat on the Brett Maher signature on the centre of the Brett Maher Court following his new club's win. He was booed off aggressively and loudly by the Adelaide fans and needed security to escort him out of the stadium.

Adelaide 36ers vs Perth Wildcats

Both teams were perennial championship contenders in the late 1980s and early 90s and had several marquee players with excellent match-ups, the three most notable all involving American imports: Al Green (Adelaide) vs Cal Bruton (Perth), Mark Davis (Adelaide) vs James Crawford (Perth) and Bill Jones (Adelaide) vs Tiny Pinder (Perth). Games during this era were rarely blowouts and helped to fuel the rivalry. Adelaide won the 1986 NBL Championship over the Brisbane Bullets and Bruton, who moved from Brisbane to be player-coach of Perth in 1987, built a team specifically to beat the reigning champions. Despite the long time rivalry between the two clubs, and the two teams having played numerous semi-final series against each other with the first being in that 1987 season, they did not face each other in a grand final series until the 2013–14 season, which was won by the Perth Wildcats. the Wildcats have won each semi-finals series played between the two (1987, 1989 and 1995).

The 1995 series proved to be one of the most volatile and controversial due to an incident between 36ers forward Chris Blakemore and Perth's Martin Cattalini in Game 1 in Adelaide. Under instructions from coach Mike Dunlap to basically belt the next Perth player to go through the key, Blakemore back handed Cattalini, giving the Wildcats forward a large cut on his mouth that required 15 stitches. Blakemore was suspended for Game 2 in Perth as the Wildcats swept the 36ers 2–0 before going on to defeat the defending champion North Melbourne Giants (who had swept Adelaide in 1994) 2–1 in the Grand Final. In an ironic twist, Cattalini would join the 36ers in 1996 and later went on to win two championships with the club (plus another with Perth), while Blakemore, the NBL's Rookie of the year in 1993 and its Most Improved Player award winner in 1994, as well as playing for the Australian Boomers in 1995, joined the Canberra Cannons in 1996 and his career went downhill from there with his NBL career ending at the end of 1997 after just two seasons with the Cannons.

As the mainstay players began to slow with age and retire, the intensity of this rivalry has declined. The two clubs remain some of the most successful in the NBL with four championships for Adelaide and ten for Perth, and are first and second on the all-time wins list (748 wins for Perth, 692 wins for Adelaide as of 20 May 2021) and have also matched up on more occasions (134 times total; Perth leading all time between the two 73 – 61) than any other two teams in the NBL (as of 15 November 2019). The rivalry continues into the 2012–13 season with the 36ers beating the Wildcats in back to back games in rounds 6 and 7, including the opening game at Perth's new home, the Perth Arena, in front of a then record Wildcats crowd of 11,562.

The Wildcats and the 36ers dominated the 2013–14 NBL season, finishing first and second respectively during the regular round. After the three previous semi-final meetings, they then faced off in their first ever Grand Final series which saw the Wildcats emerge with their record 6th NBL championship with a 2–1 series win. This was one of the most anticipated series in NBL history, not only given the two clubs' long-standing rivalry, but also due to the post-game on court 'brawl' which took place following their Round 18 clash in Perth earlier in the season.

Adelaide and Perth play for the Cattalini Cup named for Perth born Martin Cattalini who won two championships with each club. In each game, the game MVP is awarded with the Paul Rogers Medal named for Adelaide born centre Paul Rogers who made his NBL debut for the 36ers in 1992 and later joined Perth, winning 2 championships and the NBL MVP award in 2000 while with the Wildcats.

Cairns Taipans vs Townsville Crocodiles

A local derby-style rivalry nicknamed "Reptile Rumble" has developed to determine which is the dominant North Queensland team. The Cairns-Townsville basketball rivalry would have to be one of the longest and most passionate in the NBL. Both teams generally attract a close to capacity crowd anywhere from 4000+ at their home games. Each team and their supporters and mascots generally boo and taunt their visiting rivals. The rivalry has been in existent for over 10 years and almost came to a near end when the Cairns Taipans were on the verge of extinction due to financial issues.

The rivalry between the two North Queensland based clubs is currently extinct due to the Crocodiles folding at the end of the 2015–16 NBL season.

Illawarra Hawks vs Sydney Kings

Illawarra Hawks fans consider the Sydney Kings to be their most fierce rival. Many Hawks players have moved to the Kings including two former Rookie of the Year winners and a two-time Olympian. In the absence of the Kings, the Sydney Spirit took the role of rival, but this felt fake to some Hawks faithful. The Hawks took bragging rights after the 2000–01 season when they became the first team from New South Wales to qualify for the NBL finals, which they won against Townsville. Sydney then took the ascendency when they won three championships in a row, including a clean sweep of the Hawks.

The next time they met in the post-season, Sydney swept the Hawks 2–0 in the 2022 Semi-Finals enroute to their fourth championship.

New Zealand Breakers vs Perth Wildcats

The Breakers and the Wildcats have arguably been the NBL's strongest teams and have been fairly evenly matched. Between them, they have won every year's premiership from 2009–10 to 2016–17 and met in the final in 2011–12 and 2012–13 (both won by the Breakers) and 2015–16 (won by the Wildcats). Both teams have similarities in that they have to travel great distances to play any other NBL team. These two factors have combined to make a "derby of distance" between the NBL's farthest-flung members. The rivalry may have its origins in a scrap between players from each side after a game in 2004. Games between the two sides have been intense ones for several years and often marked with incident.

Melbourne United vs South East Melbourne Phoenix

Known as the "Throwdown", these two teams formed a rivalry as they are both based in Melbourne and play their games at John Cain Arena. The first Throwdown was the Phoenix's first game in the NBL, as well as the first game of the 2019–20 NBL season, with the Phoenix winning 91–88.

The two teams have since met in the 2021 semi-finals, with United winning the series 2–1.

Organisation

Sponsorship 
At the start of the 2004–05 season, the NBL struck a new television deal with Fox Sports in Australia and a multi-year naming-rights sponsorship deal with electronics manufacturer Philips. Though in 2007, Philips announced they would not continuing their naming rights sponsorship in response to the NBL wishing to increase the sponsorship deal. On 18 September 2007, the NBL announced Hummer as their naming rights sponsor for the 2007–08 season.

On 13 September 2010, iiNet was announced as the NBL naming rights sponsor and Centrebet as the official sports betting partner. Spalding provided equipment including the official game ball, with AND1 supplying team apparel. The iiNet sponsorship lasted for 3 seasons, and the Centrebet sponsorship lasted for two seasons.

On 5 October 2017, Hungry Jack's became the naming rights sponsor for the NBL. The Hungry Jack's logo features on player jerseys, in and around venues and the company is closely associated with Heritage Month in January.

Naming rights 
 1979 to 1987: none
 1988 to 1991: Hungry Jack's
 1992 to 2001–02: Mitsubishi
 2002–03 to 2003–04: none
 2004–05 to 2006–07: Philips
 2007–08: Hummer
 2008–09 to 2009–10: none
 2010–11 to 2012–13: iiNet
 2013–14 to 2016–17: none
 2017–18 to present: Hungry Jack's

Media coverage 
National television broadcasting rights are as follows: While the ABC had exclusive national broadcasting rights from 1979 to 1987, other television stations around the country (usually those affiliated with either the Seven Network or Network Ten) would broadcast their local teams to their state markets once the sport gained popularity. For example, in the mid-1980s the Adelaide 36ers and Brisbane Bullets home games were shown in Adelaide and Brisbane by Network Ten stations SAS and TV0 respectively.

In 2015, Fox Sports secured a 5-year deal for the Australian broadcasting rights of all games, starting with the 2015–16 season. In addition, for the 2015–16 season Nine Network secured one weekly match (every Sunday afternoon) for FTA. In 2016, SBS secured the exclusive free-to-air rights for the 2016–17 season, broadcasting and streaming online one Sunday match live each week. In the 2017–18 Season, SBS broadcast 2 games live, one on Saturday and another on Sunday, while ABC broadcast a Friday night game on delay at 11pm. In 2021, the NBL signed a three-year deal with ESPN, Foxtel, Kayo Sports and News Corp, with every game broadcast on ESPN and Kayo Sports, and selected games broadcast with the NBL's free-to-air partner 10 Peach.

In August 2022, FanDuel TV announced they had acquired the broadcast rights to the NBL in the United States.

Squad formation and salary cap 

Most teams have historically featured at least one and usually two American imports. Currently, teams are limited to having three imports (i.e., non-Australasians) on the roster at any one time; NBL initiatives in recent years have added two roster slots that may be filled by imports without counting against the three-import limit. Some of these players have moved to Australia permanently and become Australian citizens; a few including Cal Bruton, Mark Davis, Leroy Loggins and Ricky Grace have even played for the Australian national team (under a FIBA rule that allows one naturalised player to compete for a national team).

The NBL's salary cap for the 2006–07 season was 776,000, and increased to 810,000 for the 2007–08 season; the cap rose for two consecutive years due to the continued growth of the NBL. The salary cap rose 1,000,000 for the 2009–10 season. The cap remains at 1,000,000 for the 2012–13 season.

For the 2016–17 season, the salary cap was changed from a 1,000,000 ‘hard cap’ to a 1,100,000 ‘soft cap’. Teams may exceed the soft cap provided that they pay a salary equalisation subsidy based on the extent to which they have exceeded the cap. In addition, player values for purposes of the salary cap are not based on the salary submitted to the NBL, but are determined by a special NBL panel. The cap regulations also mandate that teams distribute their salaries so that at least one group of five players has a collective cap value of no more than 400,000. Both cap numbers (the soft cap and the 5-player aggregate cap) have increased since then, based on average NBL salaries.

On 9 May 2014, to help attract high-calibre imports or offer financial incentive for local stars considering overseas opportunities, the NBL introduced a marquee player rule, in which a team can nominate one player whose salary is paid outside the cap, with a 25% Marquee Player levy applied to any payment made above the salary cap. For the 2016–17 season, the value was modified so that if the marquee player is a "non-restricted" player (explained below), only the first $150,000 of that player's salary will be counted toward that team's salary cap.

NBL legend Andrew Gaze has pointed to these changes being instrumental to the improvement of NBL and its Australian players.

Also effective in 2016–17, the number of import roster slots was increased from two to three, and each team was allowed (but not required) to have one player from a FIBA Asia or FIBA Oceania country other than Australia or New Zealand on its roster who would not be counted against the import limit. Since then, the NBL has used the term "non-restricted" to describe all players signed as locals, including Asian/Oceanic players signed under the regional initiative. With this change, many of the best Asian-born players were expected to seek NBL contracts, as teams can now recruit them and play them as locals.

In 2020, the NBL reduced the number of imports per club from 3 to 2.

The maximum length of NBL player contracts is three years. The 2020–21 NBL salary cap has been set at $US 1,227,930, with one marquee 'local' player (including players with Asian or Oceania passports) and traditional imports exempt from the salary cap. Next Stars may also be exempt.

Next Stars Program 

On 2 March 2018, the NBL announced the "Next Stars" initiative which would launch with the NBL's 2018–19 season. The scheme is designed to provide young elite overseas players, mainly Americans (who are currently barred from the NBA draft until one year out of secondary school), as well as Australians and New Zealanders considering U.S. college basketball, with a professional option immediately out of secondary school. Each team will receive one additional import roster slot intended to provide a "Next Star" slot. Players who will be part of the scheme will be selected by a special NBL panel and, should they accept the NBL's offer, be contracted directly by the NBL and placed into an allocation pool to be distributed among the NBL's teams. The chosen players will receive a salary of at least 100,000, as well as a car, apartment, and flights home during NBL breaks. The scheme will be funded for the first season by the NBL, meaning that "Next Star" players will not count against the salary cap. Finally, under current rules, the NBA allows its teams to spend up to 700,000 to buy players out of professional contracts in non-North American leagues; should a "Next Star" be bought out by an NBA team (or by a team in another overseas league), the buyout amount will be split between the team and the NBL. The first player signed to a Next Star contract was American Brian Bowen, signed on 7 August 2018 and assigned to the Sydney Kings.

Uniforms 
Since the 2020–21 season, Champion has supplied the uniforms for all teams in the NBL.

City Round 
With the introduction of First Ever as uniform supplier in 2018, the NBL announced the "City" round. During this annual round, all teams wear limited edition jerseys which are specific to the city of their team.

Indigenous Round 
In December 2018, the Illawarra Hawks and Sydney Kings wore Indigenous based jerseys to celebrate "the rich Indigenous culture within basketball as a whole."

After this successful launch, the NBL announced that in the 2019–20 season all teams would be competing in an Indigenous round.

Honours

List of champions

Regular season champions 

* Note: In 1983 and 1984, the NBL was split into Eastern and Western divisions during the regular season.

Hall of Fame 

The NBL Hall of Fame was instituted by the NBL in 1998 as part of their 20th season celebrations, to recognise the outstanding players, coaches, referees and contributors to the NBL. In 2010, the NBL Hall of Fame united with the Basketball Australia Hall of Fame to create the Australian Basketball Hall of Fame.

To be eligible for induction into the Hall of Fame, NBL candidates must have fulfilled the following criteria:

 Players must have made an outstanding contribution to the NBL, have been retired for a minimum of four seasons, and have played 100 NBL games or more.
 Coaches must have made an outstanding contribution to the NBL, have been retired for at least four seasons, and have been an NBL head coach for 10 seasons or more.
 Referees must have made an outstanding contribution to the NBL and have been retired for at least four seasons.
 Contributors must have made an outstanding contribution to the NBL, and may be elected at any time.

Awards 

 25th Anniversary Team (2003)
 20th Anniversary Team (1998)
 Most Valuable Player
 Most Valuable Player – Grand Final
 Coach of the Year
 Rookie of the Year
 Most Improved Player
 Best Defensive Player
 Best Sixth Man
 Good Hands Award (defunct)
 Most Efficient Player (defunct)
 All-NBL Team
 Scoring champions

Road trips
Doomsday Double
The Doomsday Double, involving a road trip to play the Adelaide 36ers and Perth Wildcats during the same round, has occurred 141 times as at the end of the 2010–11 season. Only four teams have won both legs of the trip, played either on consecutive nights or on a Friday night and Sunday afternoon. Due to the long time success rate of both the 36ers and Wildcats, the Double has long been considered the toughest two games in one weekend road trip in the NBL. The Doomsday Double was given its name by Hall of Famer Cal Bruton during its early days when the trip was a game in Perth on the Friday night followed by Adelaide the following night or vice versa.

Sunshine Swing
Similar to the Doomsday Double, the Sunshine Swing pits teams against an away double or even triple game schedule against opponents from the state of Queensland, in the same round. The most frequent combinations have featured the Brisbane Bullets/Gold Coast Rollers or Cairns Taipans/Townsville Crocodiles double. Other variants include Brisbane Bullets/Cairns Taipans (current version), Brisbane Bullets/Townsville Crocodiles and the Brisbane Bullets/Cairns Taipans/Townsville Crocodiles triple.

NBLxNBA 

NBLxNBA is a series involving clubs from the NBL and the National Basketball Association (NBA) of Northern America. The series started in 2017 for each organisation's 2017–18 season, and each season includes between two and seven games. The games have previously always been held in the U.S. and Canada, and typically are held during September and early October.

NBL All-Star Game 

The NBL All-Star Game is an event that was first contested in 1982 by East and West teams. It was revived in 1988 when North and South teams competed. This match was played annually until 1997. In 2003–04 season the concept was revived with an east–west match being held in Melbourne. The following season saw a change of format, with a local team (Aussie All-Stars) playing an imports team (World All-Stars). This was discontinued after the 2007–08 season. The concept was revived in 2012 with an All-Star game between North and South that was scheduled for December 2012.

See also

 Basketball Australia
 Basketball in Australia
 List of attendance figures at domestic professional sports leagues – the NBL in a worldwide context
 List of National Basketball League (Australia) venues
 NBL All-time Records
 New Zealand National Basketball League (NZNBL)
 Women's National Basketball League (WNBL)

References

External links 
 
 Basketball Australia official website
 NBL All-Time Stats at AussieHoopla.com
 NBL Historical Stats at SpatialJam.com
 NBL History 1979–1999

National Basketball League (NBL)
Basketball leagues in Australia
Basketball leagues in New Zealand
Professional sports leagues in Australia
Professional sports leagues in New Zealand
1979 establishments in Australia
Sports leagues established in 1979
Multi-national professional sports leagues